Eidanger is a rural parish and former municipality of Porsgrunn, in Telemark County, Norway.

History
Eidanger was established as a municipality on 1 January 1838 (see formannskapsdistrikt). It was merged with Porsgrunn on 1 January 1964.

The main part of Eidanger is a peninsula between the Eidangerfjord and the Frierfjord. Situated between the urban communities of Brevik and Porsgrunn, and with excellent natural conditions for building harbours, it became the site of Norsk Hydro's plant at Herøya and the Dalen Portland (now part of the Norcem corporation) concrete factory just outside Brevik. Another major industry is Heistad Fabrikker, which makes products for diabetics. Isola  maintains its head office and administration office  in Eidanger. Isola has two factories in this area where bitumen-based products and steel roofing tiles are manufactured.

Eidanger church (Eidanger kirke) is located in the former Eidanger municipality. The church was originally a relatively simple stone church in the Romanesque style, probably built ca. 1150. The church was extended in 1787 and received a new sacristy in 1981. The altarpiece, stained glass and the pulpit is from 1991 and made by Terje Grøstad.  The baptismal font is of stone and is from the 1890s. The church has two bells, one from 1720  and one from 1940.

The name
The Old Norse form of the name was Eiðangr. The first element is eið n 'isthmus, neck of land', the last element is angr m 'fjord'.

References

Former municipalities of Norway
Populated places in Porsgrunn